Troy Christopher Taylor is an American singer, songwriter, and record producer best known for his production work and mentorship of R&B singer Trey Songz. Taylor is also the CEO of Songbook Entertainment, and has worked extensively with acts including The Isley Brothers, Aretha Franklin, Whitney Houston, and Boyz II Men. 

Taylor, signed in early 1990 to a solo record deal with Motown, decided to instead explore songwriting and production for other artists, placing records from his unreleased debut album on other projects he was writing for at the time. The album was eventually released in 2021. In the 1990s/early 2000s, Taylor, alongside Charles Farrar, was a member of The Characters: a production duo that worked on Boyz II Men's Cooleyhighharmony, as well as with Kenny Lattimore.

Discography 
 Shelved Debut Album (1990/1991) 
 The 90s Demos EP (2021)

Songwriting and production credits 
Credits are courtesy of Discogs, Spotify, and AllMusic.

Guest appearances

Awards and nominations

References 

African-American songwriters
American male singer-songwriters
Motown artists
American rhythm and blues singer-songwriters
Living people
African-American record producers
Year of birth missing (living people)